Mi Movimiento (English: My Movement) is second studio album by American singer De La Ghetto, released on September 28, 2018, through Warner Music Latina. It was produced by Chris Jedi, Gaby Music, BF, Sky Rompiendo, DJ Luian, Mambo Kingz, Kreate, Oby "The One", Super Solo, Chan El Genio, Kevin Adg, DJ Blass, Predikador, Rome, Urba, Tainy, DJ Giann, Jazz, Lelo, Russian, Sniggy, DJ Diego and Play-N-Skillz, and features collaborations with Daddy Yankee, Ozuna, Chris Jedi, J Balvin, Maluma, Wisin, Zion & Lennox, Brytiago, Jon Z, Almighty, Flo Rida, Plan B, Konshens and Fetty Wap

At the 20th Annual Latin Grammy Awards, the album was nominated for Best Urban Music Album while the song "Caliente" was nominated for Best Urban Song.

The album peaked at number five at the Top Latin Albums and Latin Rhythm Albums charts, being De La Ghetto's highest-charting album to date on both charts.

Background
The album is De La Ghetto's second studio album after Masacre Musical (2008) and third overall considering the compilation album Geezy Boyz (2013). In 2016, he signed to Warner Music Latina after having previously worked with small labels like Premium Latin Music and Cinq Music, and announced Mi Movimiento as his next project. The album was recorded during 2017 and 2018, he has said that "I've been at this for years, and this album shows a more mature, more global De La Ghetto, but without losing its essence", the project was originally intended to be an EP but was later structured as a full album, it features mainly reggaeton, blending it with other genres in tracks like the trap "Se Que Quieres" and the vallenato-infused "Yo Soy Tuyo".

Singles
The first single for the album was "La Fórmula", a collaboration with Daddy Yankee and Ozuna, released on September 15, 2017. During 2018, two more singles were released, "Todo el Amor" with Maluma and Wisin on June 29, 2018, and "Caliente" with J Balvin on September 7, 2018. All three singles entered the Latin Rhythm Airplay chart, peaking at numbers 14, 17 and 24, respectively, additionally, "La Formula" peaked at number 23 at the Hot Latin Songs chart and was certified platinum in United States.

Track listing

Charts

References

2018 albums
Warner Music Latina albums